Portes may refer to:

Places

France
Antheuil-Portes, in the Oise department
Les Portes-en-Ré, in the Charente-Maritime département  
Portes-en-Valdaine, in the Drôme département 
Portes, Eure, in the Eure département
Portes, Gard, in the Gard département
Portes-lès-Valence, in the Drôme département 
 , Bénonces, Ain; the third oldest Carthusian monastery

Greece
Portes, Achaea, a village in the southwestern part of Achaea
Portes, Aegina, a village on the island of Aegina
Portes, Arcadia, a village in Arcadia
Portes, Chalkidiki, a village in the municipality Nea Propontida, Chalkidiki
Portes islets off Paros, site of the MS Express Samina disaster
Portes (game), one of 3 sub-games in the Greek tables game of Tavli

People
Alain Portes (born 1961), French handball player
Alejandro Portes, Cuban-American sociologist
Andrea Portes, American novelist
Gil Portes, Filipino filmmaker
Jonathan Portes (born 1966), British-American economist, son of Richard
Pascal Portes (born 1959), French tennis player
Richard Portes (born 1941), American-British economist

See also
Porte (disambiguation)